Wu Di (born March 1, 1982, in Panzhihua, Sichuan) is a female Chinese softball player who competed at the 2004 Summer Olympics and again in the 2008 Summer Olympics

In the 2004 Olympic softball competition she finished fourth with the Chinese team. She played four matches as infielder.

External links
profile

1982 births
Living people
Olympic softball players of China
People from Panzhihua
Softball players at the 2004 Summer Olympics
Softball players at the 2008 Summer Olympics
Asian Games medalists in softball
Softball players
Sportspeople from Sichuan
Softball players at the 2006 Asian Games
Medalists at the 2006 Asian Games
Asian Games bronze medalists for China